Louis George Graff    (July 25, 1866 – April 16, 1955) was a 19th-century Major League Baseball catcher with the Syracuse Stars of the  American Association. Nicknamed "Chappie", he appeared in one game for the Stars on June 23, 1890 and recorded 2 hits in 5 at-bats with 3 RBI.

External links
Baseball-Reference page

1866 births
1955 deaths
19th-century baseball players
Major League Baseball catchers
Syracuse Stars (AA) players
Portland Gladiators players
Baseball players from Pennsylvania